= John Bedford (MP for Lewes) =

English politician

John Bedford (fl. 1378–1401) was an English politician. He sat as MP for Lewes in 1391.

By 1389, he was married to Maud.
